Tālivaldis Ķeniņš (April 22, 1919 in Liepāja – January 20, 2008 in Toronto) was a Canadian composer. He was forced to emigrate from Latvia when it fell under Soviet occupation after World War II, moving to Canada around 1951. He is credited by Canadian musicologist Paul Rapoport with having introduced many European idioms to Canadian art music. CBC Music described him as a "pioneering Canadian composer" and The Canadian Encyclopedia described him as "one of Canada's most frequently commissioned composers."

Early life and education 
Ķeniņš was born in Latvia to parents who held prominent positions in Latvian cultural and political life. His father, Atis Ķeniņš, was a lawyer, educator, diplomat, poet, translator, and politician who served as a government official and his mother, Anna, was a journalist and writer. Later, the Soviet government would deport Ķeniņš's father. As a child, he was known as "Tali." He first began playing piano at the age of five, and his first compositions followed at age eight.

Initially, Ķeniņš studied to be a diplomat at the Lycee Champollion in Grenoble, but moved to Riga between 1940 and 1944, studying composition and piano under Jāzeps Vītols. In the time of World War II, amid the second Soviet occupation of Latvia, Ķeniņš was forced to emigrate. He then studied at the Paris Conservatory under Tony Aubin, Olivier Messiaen and others from 1945 to 1951, and won first prize there for his Cello Sonata. While living in Paris, he earned a living as a pianist by accompanying singers, playing in theatrical productions, and performing in dance bands. He was the recipient of the Perilhou, Gouy d'Arcy and Halphen music prizes. Upon graduating in 1950, he won the Grand Prix Laureate for his talent as a composer. That same year, he received a scholarship from the UNESCO International Music Council, allowing him to pursue postgraduate work for a year.

Career  
Around 1951, Kenins' Septet was performed at the Darmstadt New Music Festival, conducted by Hermann Scherchen; that same year, he moved to Canada and was named organist at the Latvian Lutheran St. Andrews Church in Toronto. In 1952, he began teaching at the University of Toronto, where he taught for 32 years. Among his students were Tomas Dusatko, Edward Laufer, Walter Kemp, Bruce Mather, Ben McPeek, Arturs Ozoliņš, Imant Raminsh, James Rolfe, and Ronald Bruce Smith.

Artistry 
In the late 1940s and 1950s, Ķeniņš' artistry evolved, seeking to "reconcile the romanticism of his nature and the neoclassicism of a French training."

Legacy 
Canadian musicologist Paul Rapoport has credited Ķeniņš with introducing many European idioms to Canadian art music in an era when many of its composers remained solidly influenced by British models.

Personal life 
Ķeniņš married Valda Dreimane, who was also of Latvian descent.

Works
Orchestral
 8 Symphonies, including No. 1 (1959), No. 4 (1972), No. 6 Sinfonia ad Fugam (1978), No. 7 (1980), No. 8 (1986)
 12 Concertos, including Concerto for Viola and Orchestra (1998), Concerto for Violin and Orchestra and Concerto for 14 Instruments
 Canzona Sonata for solo viola and string orchestra (1986)
 Beatae Voces Tenebrae for symphony orchestra

Chamber music
 Sonata for cello and piano (1950)
 Sonata [No. 1] for violin and piano (1955)
 Sonata No. 2 for violin and piano (1979)
 Sonata for viola and piano (1995)
 Sonata for cello solo (1981)
 Adagio and Fugue for viola, cello and organ (1985)
 Elegy and Rondo for viola and piano (1979)
 Fantasy-Variations on an Eskimo Lullaby for flute and viola (1967–1972)
 Partita Breve for viola and piano (1971)
 2 piano quartets
 Septet (1951)
 Scherzo Concertante

Piano
 Piano Sonata No. 1 (1961)
 Sonata-Fantaisie (1981)
 Piano Sonata No. 3 (1985)
 Sonata for 2 pianos (1988)

Vocal
 3 cantatas
 1 oratorio

References

 Rapoport, Paul. 1994. "The Piano Music of Talivaldis Kennins." SoundNotes. SN7:16-24.

External links

 Archival papers at University of Toronto Music Library

1919 births
2008 deaths
Canadian male composers
Latvian emigrants to Canada
Latvian World War II refugees
Musicians from Liepāja
20th-century Canadian composers
Academic staff of the University of Toronto
20th-century Canadian male musicians
Latvian expatriates in France